Goyave (unlike goyave) is a commune in the French overseas region and department of Guadeloupe, Lesser Antilles. It is part of the urban area of Pointe-à-Pitre, the largest metropolitan area in Guadeloupe.

History
The parish of Goyave was founded in 1684 under the name of “Sainte-Anne de la petite rivière à Goyave” (Saint Anne of the little river at Guava). Guavas that grow abundantly beside the rivers in this area led the town to adopt its name. Slave labor was commonly used here, when slavery was legal in France, and there were many public executions of rebel slaves here.

Geography
Goyave is located on the eastern part of Basse-Terre Island and the southern section of Goyave is near the Goyave River. Goyave is near Pointe de la Riviere a Goyave and Goyave stretches out along the coast of Petit Cul de Sac Marin. Goyave is on very fertile soil.

Population

Economy
The commune gets its name from the large numbers of guava trees (goyave is the French for guava), which run alongside the river flowing from the mountain. In agriculture, the sugar cane culture has been replaced by bananas and by aquaculture.

Sights

 The Moreau Falls
 The water garden in Blonzac
 The Dull One in Louis
 The Sand Handle
 Ilet Fortune
 The beach of Holy Claire
 The Orchard of 1000 Fruits
 The village O Ti Bouboul (including the agritouristic site, the “magic forest of Moreau”)

Education
Public preschools and primary schools include:
 Ecole primaire François Auguste
 Ecole primaire Christophe
 Ecole maternelle Bourg Goyave

Public junior high schools include:
 Collège Matéliane

See also
Communes of the Guadeloupe department

References

Communes of Guadeloupe